Mark Scheifele (born March 15, 1993) is a Canadian professional ice hockey centre and alternate captain for the Winnipeg Jets of the National Hockey League (NHL). He was selected by the Jets in the first round, seventh overall, of the 2011 NHL Entry Draft, becoming the Jets' first-ever draft pick after relocating from Atlanta.

Scheifele grew up playing minor ice hockey in his hometown of Kitchener, Ontario, playing for the Kitchener Jr. Rangers rep program in the Alliance Pavilion League. After his minor midget season in 2008–09, Scheifele was drafted by the Ontario Hockey League (OHL)'s Saginaw Spirit in the seventh round of the 2009 OHL Priority Selection. His rights were later traded to the Barrie Colts and he was drafted seventh overall by the Winnipeg Jets. Scheifele played his first full NHL campaign during the 2013–14 season.

Throughout his tenure with the Jets, Scheifele has helped lead the team offensively and has served as a leader in the dressing room. During the 2015–16 season, he surpassed the 20-goal mark for the first time in his professional career and scored his first NHL hat-trick. As a result, he finished the regular season with a then-career high 61 points in 71 games and lead the team in goals. He followed that season up by leading the Jets in scoring and finished seventh in the league with 82 points in 79 games.

Scheifele has competed for Team Canada at both the junior and national level at international tournaments. After making his senior debut at the 2014 IIHF World Championship, Scheifele won his first IIHF World Championship gold medal in 2016 and was named his hometowns Athlete of the Year.

Early life 
Scheifele was born on March 15, 1993, in Kitchener, Ontario, Canada, to parents Brad and Mary Lou. His father played gridiron in high school and Brad's brother, Kyle, helped lead the football team for four years at the University of Guelph. As the youngest of three siblings, Scheifele was raised in a Christian family and attended Grandview Baptist Kitchener every Sunday.

Playing career

Amateur 
Scheifele grew up playing minor hockey in his hometown of Kitchener, Ontario, playing for the Kitchener Jr. Rangers rep program in the Alliance Pavilion League. Scheifele originally played as a defenceman before being moved to a forward position. While playing minor hockey, Scheifele said he wore the number 55 because he wanted to be like his older brother Kyle. He attended Grand River Collegiate Institute for high school, during which he competitively played volleyball, basketball, badminton, and track and field. Scheifele only began to specifically focus on hockey when he was 16 years old. After his minor midget season in 2008–09, Scheifele was drafted by the Ontario Hockey League (OHL)'s Saginaw Spirit in the seventh round of the 2009 OHL Priority Selection. However, he failed to make their roster and was assigned to his hometown Kitchener Dutchmen Jr.B. club for a year of seasoning in the Greater Ontario Junior Hockey League (OHA). During his time with the Dutchmen, he began to be noticed by universities and offered NCAA scholarships. Although he originally committed to play for the Cornell Big Red men's ice hockey team, he opted to forgo his commitment to play in the OHL.

Following the 2009–10 season, Scheifele's playing rights were traded by the Spirit (along with a second-round choice in 2013) to the Barrie Colts in exchange for goaltender Mavric Parks. Early in his rookie season with the Colts, Scheifele was awarded the OHL's Central Division Academic Award for the month of October and ranked second on the team in scoring. He was subsequently invited to the 2010 CHL/NHL Top Prospects Game at the WFCU Centre. Prior to the 2011 NHL Entry Draft, Scheifele was ranked 19th overall amongst OHL prospects and 16th among North American skaters by the NHL Central Scouting Bureau. Ultimately, he was selected seventh overall by the Winnipeg Jets, the organization's first draft pick since relocating to Winnipeg from Atlanta.

Professional 
Scheifele attended the Winnipeg Jets training camp prior to the 2011–12 season and played in their exhibition games. He also announced he would wear the jersey number 55 since his favourite number 19 was taken by Jim Slater. During the pre-season, he scored two goals and two assists in an exhibition game against the Columbus Blue Jackets, earning the first star. On October 3, 2011, the Jets announced that they had signed Scheifele to an entry-level contract, and that he would start the season on Winnipeg's NHL roster. Scheifele subsequently made his NHL debut on October 6, 2011, and scored his first career NHL goal on October 19, 2011, against James Reimer of the Toronto Maple Leafs. After playing in seven games, he was re-assigned to the OHL and rejoined the Barrie Colts to continue his development.

After the Colts were eliminated from the OHL playoff race, he was called up by the Jets to play for their American Hockey League (AHL) affiliate, the St. John's IceCaps for the 2012 Calder Cup playoffs. In September, he was named an assistant captain on the Colts, alongside Alex Lepkowski and Steven Beyers. Scheifele participated in the Jets' training camp ahead of the 2012–13 season, and played in four games with the team, before being sent back down to the Colts.  Scheifele remained with the Colts for the duration of the season, recording 79 points in 45 regular season games. During the OHL playoffs, he recorded 39 points in 19 games, including four goals in Game 4 against the London Knights to nearly qualify for the Memorial Cup. However, during the following game, Scheifele was bodychecked by the London Knights' Josh Anderson and was unable to play in Game 7.

For the 2013–14 season, Scheifele played in all 60 of Winnipeg's regular season games up to the NHL break for the 2014 Winter Olympics. During the season, he cemented his role as a top-six forward centering the Jets' second line, however, on March 4, 2014, in a game against the New York Islanders, Scheifele suffered a knee injury that forced him to miss the remainder of the regular season. He recovered during the offseason and was medically cleared to play for the Jets' training camp and 2014–15 season. He played in all 82 games during the season and recorded 49 points in 81 games. During the 2014–15 offseason, Scheifele used DNA testing to increase his muscle mass and he arrived at the Jets' training camp  heavier than the previous season.

Prior to the 2015–16 season, Scheifele was placed on the second-line centre role with Nikolaj Ehlers and Mathieu Perreault and remained there for most of the season. By November, he recorded four goals and four assists and won 44 per cent of his face offs. Despite suffering a head injury in December, he surpassed the 20-goal mark for the first time in his professional career. After Bryan Little fractured a vertebra, Scheifele was promoted to the Jets' top line where he recorded eight goals and 13 points in nine games. During the second half of the season, he scored his first NHL hat-trick in a contest against the Montreal Canadiens on March 5, 2016, thus ending the teams' three-game losing streak. Scheifele finished the regular season with a career high 61 points in 71 games as the Jets qualified for the 2016 Stanley Cup playoffs. After the team was eliminated, Scheifele signed an eight-year, $49 million contract to remain with the Winnipeg Jets. One of his reasons for staying was that Dustin Byfuglien also remained on the team.

Following the signing of his contract, Scheifele was named an assistant captain for the 2016–17 season alongside Byfuglien and captain Blake Wheeler. Jets head coach Paul Maurice praised his leadership ability, saying "Mark Scheifele is going to be the captain of this hockey team at some point in his career for sure." At the time, the current captain Blake Wheeler had two years left in his contract. Scheifele led the Jets in scoring and finished seventh in the league with 82 points in 79 games. Following his break-out season, Scheifele acknowledged there was increased pressure on the team to qualify for the Stanley Cup playoffs after missing it the past two years. With high expectations coming into the 2017–18 season, Scheifele recorded 60 points in 60 games despite missing 22 due to injuries. During the 2018 Stanley Cup playoffs, Scheifele set a new NHL record for most road goals in a postseason. By the time he played Game 3 of the Western Conference Final against the Vegas Golden Knights, he had recorded 14 goals in total, 11 of which were on the road. The previous record was held by Joe Mullen and Sidney Crosby, who scored 10 times on the road during Stanley Cup runs for the Calgary Flames and Pittsburgh Penguins, respectively. Scheifele also tied Washington Capitals captain Alexander Ovechkin for the NHL lead in road playoff goals during the past two postseasons.

In an effort to continue his scoring prowess, Scheifele hired a personal chef and met with Tom Brady's former chef Allen Campbell to "discuss food theory and write up a meal plan." He was influenced by former NHL player Gary Roberts to change up his diet which included eliminating gluten and dairy. He also trained with teammate Blake Wheeler during the summer to build chemistry. Scheifele arrived at the Jets' training camp prior to the 2018–19 season calling the Jets "a powerhouse in the West." During the 2018–19 season, Scheifele set new career highs in goals, assists, and points. By December, he was named NHL's First Star of the Week after recording a five-game point streak thus trying for tenth amongst the league leader in points.  In the same month, he was selected for his first NHL All-Star Game alongside Wheeler after he recorded 49 points to rank 11th in the league. On January 18, 2019, he was high sticked by Nashville Predators forward Ryan Johansen who was subsequently suspended for two games. The Jets finished second in the Central Division but lost in their first round series against the St. Louis Blues, who went on to win their first Stanley Cup.

Scheifele rejoined the team for the 2019–20 season which was unexpectedly paused due to the COVID-19 pandemic. In recognition of his efforts, Scheifele and teammate Connor Hellebuyck were selected for the 2020 National Hockey League All-Star Game. At the time of his selection, he led the team in points, goals, and assists, and ranked in the league's top-20 in goals. When the league was paused due to the COVID-19 pandemic, Scheifele donated $100,000 to Winnipeg Harvest Inc. to assist members in the community. He also joined the league's Return to Play (RTP) committee in an effort to finish the 2019–20 season. During the Western Conference seeding round-robin against the Calgary Flames, Scheifele suffered an Achilles tendon injury after colliding with Flames forward Matthew Tkachuk. He subsequently sat out the remainder of the playoffs, where the Jets were eliminated early, but said it did not interfere with his off-season training. When speaking about the incident, Scheifele said he holds no ill will against Tkachuk and did not believe he intended to injure him. Five months later, Scheifele returned to the Jets' line-up to compete in the North Division.

Scheifele and the Jets defeated the Edmonton Oilers in the First Round of the 2021 Stanley Cup playoffs. The following round, Scheifele was suspended four games for charging Montreal Canadiens forward Jake Evans during Game 1.

International play 

Scheifele has competed for Team Canada at both the junior and national level at international tournaments. His first international tournament was at the 2012 World Junior Ice Hockey Championships held in Calgary and Edmonton. Scheifele played on a line with Tanner Pearson and each set each other up for goals to win the bronze medal. Later that year, he also competed in the 2012 Canada–Russia Challenge where he helped Team Canada win a gold medal. Scheifele also participated in the 2013 World Junior Ice Hockey Championships, held in Ufa, Russia.

During his rookie season with the Jets, Scheifele played for the senior Canadian team at the 2014 IIHF World Championship in Minsk. However, they failed to medal at the tournament after being eliminated by Finland in the quarter-finals. He was later named to Team Canada's 2016 IIHF World Championship roster, held in Moscow and Saint Petersburg, where he won the gold medal. Following this, Scheifele was named Kitchener-Waterloo and area's top athlete for 2016. Later that year, Scheifele represented Team North America at the 2016 World Cup of Hockey, playing on the top line alongside Auston Matthews and Connor McDavid. In 2019, Scheifele announced his decision to skip the 2019 IIHF World Championship after the Jets were eliminated from the Stanley Cup playoffs.

Playing style 
Prior to being drafted into the NHL, Scheifele described himself as a "hard working, 2-way, play-making center." Once making the NHL full-time, he earned numerous praises from teammates and opponents, including former Toronto Maple Leafs head coach Mike Babcock who called him "one of the best centres in the league."

Personal life 
Scheifele is a practicing Christian and gathers with teammates Adam Lowry, Josh Morrissey, and Tucker Poolman to pray and talk. When speaking of his faith, Scheifele said: "I take the role I play in the community here as a Christian very seriously." Scheifele is also a Sport Ambassador for KidSport Winnipeg, a charity that aims to remove the financial barriers to playing sports, and runs an annual hockey camp for boys and girls on behalf of KidSport Winnipeg.

Scheifele grew up playing golf on a small course in Tavistock, Ontario, and considers himself a casual golfer. In 2018, he replaced Blake Wheeler at the PGA Tour Canada event where he posted a birdie, six pars, seven bogeys, three double bogeys and one triple for an 87. He later played in another golf tournament in support of KidSport Winnipeg.

In 2020, Scheifele was sued by his former personal chef who claimed he "didn't pay him in a "timely and consistent manner;" didn't give the chef health benefits; and "[caused] the Plaintiff to incur substantial out of pocket expenses in carrying out his duties as an employee." Scheifele responded to the lawsuit denying all claims and asked for the suit to be dismissed.

Career statistics

Regular season and playoffs

International

References

External links 

1993 births
Barrie Colts players
Canadian Christians
Canadian ice hockey centres
Canadian people of German descent
Ice hockey people from Ontario
Living people
National Hockey League first-round draft picks
Sportspeople from Kitchener, Ontario
St. John's IceCaps players
Winnipeg Jets draft picks
Winnipeg Jets players